SS Burgondier was a 5,297-ton cargo steamship built to a First World War standard design by Caird & Company at Greenock on the Firth of Clyde. She changed owners and names several times, becoming the Azul, David Dawson, Penteli and finally Brockley Hill. She was sunk by enemy action in 1941.

Propulsion
The boilers fed a Caird & Company three-cylinder triple expansion steam engine rated at 517 NHP that drove a single screw.

Peacetime career
Caird & Co launched the ship as SS War Burman but completed her in April 1919 as SS Burgondier for Lloyd Royal Belge (GB) Ltd, which registered her in London. In 1923 she was transferred to Compagnie Maritime Belge (Lloyd Royal) SA and registered in Antwerp, Belgium.

In 1926 she was sold to Buenos Aires Great Southern Railway Co, who registered her in London as Azul and placed her under the management of A. Holland & Co. In 1935 she was sold to Kaye, Son & Co, who sold her on in 1936. Her new owners, Georgian Steam Navigation Co Ltd renamed her David Dawson and placed her under the management of Frank S. Dawson and Co Ltd. In 1937 she was sold to J.A. Coulouthros and N.N. Embiricos, Andros who registered her in Greece as Penteli.

In 1939 she was sold to Brockley Hill Steamship Co Ltd who registered her in London as Brockley Hill. This was a one-ship company set up to own her by Counties Ship Management. Both companies were offshoots of the Rethymnis & Kulukundis shipbroking firm.

Sinking
Brockley Hill left Montreal, Quebec, Canada as a member of convoy Convoy HX 133 on 12 June 1941 with a cargo of grain for London. At 2106 hrs on 24 June  torpedoed and sank her in the North Atlantic southeast of Cape Farewell in Greenland. Another British cargo steamship in the convoy, James Nourse Ltd's SS Saugor, rescued all hands and landed them at Loch Ewe in Scotland.

Replacement ship
In 1947 CSM acquired the 7,082-ton Empire Ship  and renamed her Brockley Hill. She was sold in 1950 and changed hands again in 1951, being renamed Starcrest. She changed owners and names twice more, was laid up in Turkey in 1962 and scrapped there in 1970.

References

Further reading

Ships built on the River Clyde
Steamships of the United Kingdom
1918 ships
Standard World War I ships
World War I merchant ships of the United Kingdom
Merchant ships of the United Kingdom
Ships of Counties Ship Management
World War II merchant ships of the United Kingdom
Maritime incidents in June 1941
Ships sunk by German submarines in World War II
World War II shipwrecks in the Atlantic Ocean